The 1972–73 season was Manchester United's 71st season in the Football League, and their 28th consecutive season in the top division of English football. For the first and only season United took part in the Anglo-Italian Cup, the 1973 version.

In September 1972, Frank O'Farrell signed Welsh international centre-forward Wyn Davies from Manchester City for a fee of £60,000. The signing paid immediate dividends with Davies scoring on his United debut in a 3-0 win against Derby County. Shortly afterwards, O'Farrell paid Bournemouth, then in the Third Division, a reported £194,445 for the services of striker, Ted MacDougall. Despite these signings, United's results were poor and on 19 December 1972, Frank O'Farrell was sacked as United manager following a 5–0 defeat at Crystal Palace that had left them in real danger of relegation, with little improvement having been made on United's dismal nine-match winless start to the league campaign. On the same day, the club's directors also announced that the errant George Best would not be playing for them again.

Three days later Tommy Docherty was appointed as the new manager, after he resigned from the Scotland national team, and he guided United to survival. He also restored George Best to the team. Docherty's guided United to 18th place in the final table, after they managed seven league victories following his appointment.

United struggled to find goals in the league, only managing 44 from 42 games, with Bobby Charlton - in his final season as a player before retiring - topping the club's goalscoring charts with a mere six goals in the First Division. Denis Law, who had rarely played this season, was given a free transfer at the end of the campaign after 11 years with the club.

First Division

FA Cup

League Cup

Anglo-Italian Cup

English Group 1

Italian Group 1

Squad statistics

Anglo-Italian Cup matches are not included in statistics

References

Manchester United F.C. seasons
Manchester United